Golden Gryphon Press was an independent publishing company, specializing in science fiction, fantasy, dark fantasy and cross-genre novels. It was founded in 1996 by Jim Turner, former editor at Arkham House. It was operated by his brother Gary and Gary's wife, Geri, until the company's closure in 2017.

The company has published work by Robert Reed, Michael Bishop, Andy Duncan, Geoffrey A. Landis, Paul Di Filippo, James Patrick Kelly, Lucius Shepard, Charles Stross, Gregory Frost, Nancy Kress, George Alec Effinger, Warren Rochelle, Jeffrey Ford and Howard Waldrop.

References

External links 

Archive of Golden Gryphon Press homepage

American speculative fiction publishers
Book publishing companies based in Illinois
Horror book publishing companies
Publishing companies established in 1996
Science fiction publishers
Small press publishing companies